The Cahuilla Band of Indians is a federally recognized tribe of Cahuilla people located in Southern California. They were formerly the Cahuilla Band of Cahuilla Indians of the Cahuilla Reservation.

Their tribe originally came from Coachella Valley, through San Gorgonio Pass, to the San Jacinto Mountains. In 1875, their tribe had been relocated to present-day Anza.

Reservation
The Cahuilla Reservation is located in Riverside County near the town of Anza. The reservation include Cahuilla, California, where the Cahuilla Casino is located. It was founded in 1875.

Government
The Cahuilla Band of Cahuilla Indians is headquartered in Anza, California. They are governed by a democratically elected tribal council, with a total of 5 members. Their positions change every 4 years, and are staggered so half the positions change every 2 years. Their current council is Daniel Salgado (chairman), Andrea Candelaria (vice-chairwoman), Erica Rae Macias (secretary/treasurer), Adrian Salgado Sr. (council member), and Gerald Clarke (council member).

Economic development
The tribe owns the Cahuilla Casino, first opened in 1996, and Mountain Sky Travel Center, a convenience store and gas station first opened in 2015, both located in Cahuilla with address in nearby Anza.  A new casino and hotel, after some delay from the coronavirus, replaced the old casino and was opened May 2020.

Notable tribal members

Chief Meyers (1880–1971), professional baseball player
Gerald Clarke (1967- ), artist and professor

Culture and traditions
The Cahuilla tribe's origin story starts off with two brothers, Mukat and Tamaoit, who help create the world. They created the skies, sea, and the rules that governed the land, but each had a different idea in mind when creating the image of a human. Tamaoit took his creation of man and went to the underworld, while Mukat stayed above ground. However, some of Mukat's creations were burned, and they scattered to different parts of the globe, each speaking a different language. Only one man spoke the same language as Mukat, so Mukat named this man the first ancestor of the Cahuilla. During this time, Mukat also created a path to the afterlife where the path was surrounded by moving hills. When people died, the good people could pass onto the afterlife; the bad people would be crushed by the moving hills and transformed into a small creature, such as an insect.

The Cahuilla Band's language is derived from the Uto-Aztecan language, and according to a 1990 census only around 35 speakers still speak the original language today. Now, they pass down their language and culture through various songs, games, and stories. One of these song traditions is bird singing, where multiple tribes gather to sing different songs. Before, it was also used to help people find potential marriage partners, but now it is used to gather old friends and relatives. Another prominent tradition is basket weaving, where people gather to weave different baskets; here, the older generation passes down millennia old traditions to the younger generation. Another prominent tradition is their funeral ceremony, where they bury their loved ones and sing songs all night. The funeral lasts for 7 days, and close relatives of the deceased are not allowed to participate in joyful traditions (such as dancing) for a year.

Bibliography
 Eargle, Jr., Dolan H. California Indian Country: The Land and the People. San Francisco: Tree Company Press, 1992. .
 Pritzker, Barry M. A Native American Encyclopedia: History, Culture, and Peoples. Oxford: Oxford University Press, 2000. .

References

Further reading

External links
 Home page Cahuilla Band

Cahuilla
California Mission Indians
Native American tribes in California
Federally recognized tribes in the United States
Native American tribes in Riverside County, California